At the 1954 British Empire and Commonwealth Games, the athletics events were held at Empire Stadium in Vancouver, British Columbia, Canada in July and August 1954. A total of 29 athletics events were contested at the Games, 20 by men and 9 by women. A total of twenty-four Games records were set or improved over the competition, leaving just five previous best marks untouched. The 1954 edition saw the introduction of the shot put and discus throw for women, as well as the first 4×110 yards relay for women (which replaced a medley relay).

The men's mile run competition – dubbed The Miracle Mile – represented a landmark in the history of the Four-minute mile. Roger Bannister had been the first to have broken the barrier earlier that year, but Landy followed soon after with sub-4 minute (and world record time) of his own. The games offered the first time that two sub-4 minute runners had duelled against each other. Landy led until the final curve, at which point he turned to gauge Bannister's position. Bannister took the opportunity to overtake him on his blind side and he edged out a victory over Landy with a time of 3:58.8 minutes. Landy also ran under four minutes, representing the first time two men had done so in the same race. A sculpture of the race-deciding moment was later placed outside the stadium in memory of the duel.

Jim Peters, then the world record holder in the marathon, entered the stadium some seventeen minutes ahead of his nearest rival in the Games marathon. He collapsed in his final lap of the stadium, however, and did not finish the race (which was won by Joe McGhee).

A new Commonwealth record for the high jump was established at the games by Emmanuel Ifeajuna of Nigeria, who became the first Commonwealth athlete to clear six feet and eight inches. Ifeajuna was also the first black African to win a gold medal at the Commonwealth Games.

Medal summary

Men

Women

Medal table

Participating nations

 (27)
 (3)
 (3)
 (1)
 (69)
 (39)
 (11)
 (7)
 (1)
 (4)
 (8)
 (9)
 (14)
 (9)
 (5)
 (3)
 (8)
 (6)
 (7)
 (1)
 (3)
 (5)
 (6)

References

Results
Commonwealth Games Medallists - Men. GBR Athletics. Retrieved on 2010-08-30.
Commonwealth Games Medallists - Women. GBR Athletics. Retrieved on 2010-08-30.

External links
Bannister's "Miracle Mile" video from British Pathé

1954 British Empire and Commonwealth Games events
1954
British Empire and Commonwealth Games
1954 British Empire and Commonwealth Games